The United States Marine Corps Military Occupational Specialty (MOS) is a system of categorizing career fields. All enlisted and officer Marines are assigned a four-digit code denoting their primary occupational field and specialty.  Additional MOSs may be assigned through a combination of training and/or experience, which may or may not include completion of a formal school and assignment of a formal school code.

Occupational Fields (OccFlds) are identified in the first two digits and represents a grouping of related MOSs. Job codes are identified in the last two digits and represent a specific job within that OccFld.

The USMC now publishes an annual Navy/Marine Corps joint publication (NAVMC) directive in the 1200 Standard Subject Identification Code (SSIC) series to capture changes to the MOS system.  Previous versions of MCO 1200.17_ series directives are cancelled, including MCO 1200.17E, the last in the series before beginning the annual NAVMC-type directive series.

On 30 June 2016, the Marine Corps announced the renaming of 19 MOSs with gender-neutral job titles, replacing the word or word-part "man" with the word "Marine" in most. Not all instances of the word or word-part "man" were removed, e.g., 0171 Manpower Information Systems (MIS) Analyst, 0311 Rifleman, 0341 Mortarman.

On 15 October 2020, the Marine Corps announced a structured review of 67 Marine Corps MOSs. This review is part of a larger Marine Corps force redesign initiated in March 2020 which was initiated to help the Corps re-align for the future.

Restrictions on officer MOSs include:

 Restricted officers (limited duty officers and warrant officers) cannot hold non-primary MOSs and will be limited to Primary MOS (PMOS) – Basic MOS (BMOS) matches.
 Colonels are considered fully qualified Marine Air Ground Task Force (MAGTF) Officers and, with the exception of lawyers and MOSs 8059/61 Acquisition Management Professionals, will only hold MOSs 8040, 8041, or 8042 as PMOS. Non-PMOSs will not be associated in current service records with General Officers and Colonels, with the exception of MOSs 822X/824X Foreign Area Officers and Regional Affairs Officers. 
 MOSs must be required in sufficient numbers as Billet MOSs (BMOS) in the Total Force Structure Manpower System (TFSMS) to be justified. MOSs with no Table of Organization (T/O) requirement or no inventory are subject to deletion/disapproval.
 MOSs must serve a Human Resources Development Process (HRDP) purpose (establish a skill requirement, manpower planning, manages the forces, manage training, identify special pay billets). MOSs not meeting this criterion will be deemed nonperforming MOSs and subject to deletion/disapproval.
 A single track is limited to a single MOS. Separate MOSs are not appropriate based on grade changes unless merging with other MOSs.

An enlisted applicant (male or female) seeking a Program Enlisted For (PEF) code associated with MOSs 0311, 0313, 0321, 0331, 0341, 0351, 0352, 0811, 0842, 0844, 0847, 0861, 1371, 1812, 1833, 2131, 2141, 2146, 2147, or 7212 must meet certain gender-neutral physical standards. For the Initial Strength Test (IST), the applicant must achieve 3 pull-ups, a 13:30 1.5-mile run, 44 crunches, and 45 ammo can lifts. The MOS Classification Standards based on a recruits final CFT and PFT are: 6 pull-ups, 24:51 3-mile run, 3:12 Maneuver Under Fire Course, 3:26 Movement to Contact Court, and 60 ammo can lifts.

Below are listed the current authorized Marine Corps MOSs, organized by OccFld, then by specific MOS. Most MOSs have specific rank/pay grade requirements and are listed to the right of the MOS title, if applicable (see United States Marine Corps rank insignia), abbreviated from the highest allowed rank to the lowest. Officer ranks are noted as Unrestricted Line Officers (ULOs), Limited Duty Officers (LDOs), and Warrant Officers (WOs). Those MOSs which are no longer being awarded are generally kept active within the Marine's service records to allow Marines to earn a new MOS and to maintain a record of that Marine's previous skills and training over time.  All MOSs entered into the Marine Corps Total Force System (MCTFS) electronic service records will populate into DoD manpower databases, and be available upon request to all Marines through their Verification of Military Education and Training (VMET) portal, even when MOSs are merged, deactivated, or deleted from the current NAVMC 1200 bulletin, or from MCTFS.

Note: All listed MOSs are PMOS, unless otherwise specified.

Types of MOSs 
There are three categories of MOSs:

 Occupational Fields 01-79 (Regular OccFlds) – Occupational Fields that contain all types of MOSs related to a specific occupational field.
 80XX (Miscellaneous Requirement MOSs) – These are MOSs that do not fit into a regular OccFld but are used on the Marine Corps Table of Organization (T/O).
 90XX (Reporting MOS) – These MOSs do not exist on the USMC T/O. They are used to meet Department of Navy and Department of Defense reporting requirements.

There are six types of MOSs, divided into primary MOSs and non-primary MOSs. Primary MOSs are of three types:
 Basic MOS – Entry-level MOSs required for entry-level Marines (both officers and enlisted) or others not yet qualified by initial skills training. In addition, when a Reserve Component (RC) Marine transfers to a new unit and does not possess the MOS required for the billet filled, they will be assigned a Basic MOS as Primary MOS until the completion of required formal school training or is otherwise certified to be MOS qualified, and the previous PMOS will be retained but become an Additional MOS. Promotions for enlisted Marines will be based upon their Basic MOS, or if qualified for a PMOS, then upon their PMOS, never on an AMOS.
 Primary MOS (PMOS) – Used to identify the primary skills and knowledge of a Marine. Only enlisted Marines, Warrant Officers, Chief Warrant Officers, and Limited Duty Officers are promoted in their primary MOS. Changes to an Active Component Marine's PMOS without approval from CMC (MM) and changes to a RC Marine's PMOS without approval from CMC (RA) are not authorized. Promotions for enlisted Marines will be based upon their Basic MOS, or if qualified for a PMOS, then upon their PMOS, never on an AMOS.
 Additional MOS (AMOS) – Any existing PMOS awarded to a Marine who already holds a PMOS. Example: after a lateral move to a new job, a Marine's previous PMOS becomes an AMOS and is normally retained in the Marine's service records for historical purposes and manpower management. Marines are not promoted in an AMOS.

There are also three types of non-PMOSs:
 Necessary (NMOS) – A non-PMOS that has a prerequisite of one or more PMOSs. This MOS identifies a particular skill or training that is in addition to a Marine's PMOS, but can only be filled by a Marine with a specific PMOS. When entered as a requirement into the TFSMS, a billet bearing a Necessary MOS must identify a single associated PMOS even if several PMOSs are acceptable prerequisites.
 Free (FMOS) – Non-PMOS that can be filled by any Marine regardless of Primary MOS. A Free MOS requires skill sets unrelated to primary skills.
 Exception (EMOS) – Non-PMOS that is generally a FMOS, but includes exceptions that require a PMOS.

Reporting MOSs and billet designators are special MOSs:
 Reporting MOSs – designated in the 90XX OccFld, but are not found on any USMC T/O as a requirement to fill any billet.  They exist solely to capture skills and training that meet Department of Navy and Department of Defense reporting requirements.
 Billet MOSs (BMOS) – The MOS listed on USMC T/Os for each billet within the organization, usually PMOS, but also NMOS, FMOS, EMOS, or Billet Designators. Some billets will include notes about acceptable alternate MOSs, such as a BMOS of 0402 (Logistics Officer) that notes a 3002 (Supply Officer) is an acceptable staffing substitute for that billet.
 Billet Designators – An FMOS requirement indicator, listed on USMC T/Os as a BMOS that can be filled by any Marine of the appropriate grade that is included in the MOS definition (e.g., MOS 8007 Billet Designator-Unrestricted Ground Officer (I) FMOS). Normally, FMOS as a skill designator cannot be a BMOS in the TFSMS.

Relationship of MOS to promotions 
Officers are selected for promotion for their potential to carry out the duties and responsibilities of the next higher grade based upon past performance as indicated in their official military personnel file. Promotions should not be considered a reward for past performance, but as incentive to excel in the next higher grade. Officers are not strictly promoted based upon their MOS; all MOS carried by an officer are considered during the selection board process.

Enlisted Marines are promoted based upon their Basic MOS, or their PMOS if one has been earned, not their AMOS, FMOS, NMOS, or EMOS, although upon consideration by a selection board for promotion to Staff Sergeant (E-6) and above, the Board Members will be able to view evidence of other MOSs in the service records of the Marine.

01 Personnel & Administration 
Enlisted

 0100 Basic Administrative Marine – GySgt–Pvt
 0111 Administrative Specialist – MGySgt–Pvt
 0121 Service Records Book Clerk – Sgt–Pvt (consolidated into MOS 0111)
 0131 Unit Diary Clerk – Sgt–Pvt (consolidated into MOS 0111)
 0147 Equal Opportunity Advisor (EOA) (FMOS) – MGySgt–SSgt
 0149 Substance Abuse Control Specialist (FMOS) – MGySgt–SSgt
 0151 Administrative Clerk – Sgt–Pvt (consolidated into MOS 0111)
 0161 Postal Clerk – MGySgt–Pvt
 0171 Manpower Information Systems (MIS) Analyst (NMOS 0111) – MGySgt–Cpl
 0193 Administrative Chief – MGySgt–SSgt (consolidated into MOS 0111)
Officer

 0101 Basic Manpower Officer – LtCol–2ndLt
 0102 Manpower Officer – LtCol–2ndLt
 0107 Civil Affairs Officer (FMOS) – LtCol–2ndLt (redesignated 0503 Civil Affairs Officer c. 2001)
 0149 Substance Abuse Control Officer (SACO) (FMOS) – Gen–2ndLt
 0160 Postal Officer – CWO5–WO
 0170 Personnel Officer – CWO5–WO
 0180 Adjutant – LtCol–2ndLt (PMOS 0180 redesignated to PMOS 0102 Manpower Officer, 1 Oct 2014.)

02 Intelligence 

Enlisted

 0200 Basic Intelligence Marine – GySgt–Pvt
 0211 Counterintelligence/Human Source Intelligence (CI/HUMINT) Specialist – MSgt–Cpl
 0212 Technical Surveillance Countermeasures (TSCM) Specialist (NMOS 0211) – MSgt–Sgt
 0231 Intelligence Specialist – MSgt–Pvt
 0239 Intelligence Analyst – MGySgt–Cpl (MOS added after 1 Oct 2012.)
 0241 Imagery Analysis Specialist – MSgt–Pvt
 0261 Geographic Intelligence Specialist – MSgt–Pvt
 0275 Collection Manager - MSgt-Sgt
 0282 Tactical Debriefer (FMOS) (MOS added after 1 Oct 2012.)
 0283 Advanced Foreign Counterintelligence Specialist (MOS added after 1 Oct 2012.)
 0287 Military Source Operations Specialist (FMOS) (MOS added after 1 Oct 2012.)
 0289 Strategic Debriefing Specialist (FMOS) (MOS added after 1 Oct 2012.)
 0291 Intelligence Chief (PMOS) – MGySgt
 0293 Advanced Military Source Operations Specialist (MOS added after 1 Oct 2012.)
Officer
 0201 Basic Intelligence Officer
 0202 Intelligence Officer – LtCol–2ndLt
 0203 Ground Intelligence Officer – LtCol–2ndLt
 0204 Counter Intelligence/Human Source Intelligence Officer – LtCol–2ndLt
 0205 Master Analyst – CWO5–WO (renamed from Senior All-Source Intelligence Analysis Officer, April 2017)
 0206 Signals Intelligence/Ground Electronic Warfare Officer – LtCol–2ndLt
 0207 Air Intelligence Officer – LtCol–2ndLt
 0209 Marine Air Ground Task Force (MAGTF) Intelligence Planner - LtCol-Maj
 0210 Counterintelligence/Human Source Intelligence (CI/HUMINT) Operations Officer – CWO5–WO
 0220 Surveillance Sensor Officer
 0233 Intelligence Tactics Instructor (NMOS) – LtCol–2ndLT & CWO5–WO (new as of April 2017)
 0275 Collection Management Officer - LtCol-1stLt & CWO5-WO
 0277 Weapons and Tactics Instructor (WTI) Intelligence Officer (NMOS) – LtCol–2ndLt & CWO5–WO
 0251 Interrogator/Debriefer - MSgt-Cpl
 0284 Advanced Foreign Counterintelligence Officer
 0286 Advanced Military Source Operations Officer
 0288 Military Source Operations Officer
 0290 Strategic Debriefing Officer

03 Infantry 

Enlisted

*The core enlisted infantry MOSs for the USMC are 0311, 0331, 0341, (formerly 0351 until 2021), and 0352; and Marines are trained in these jobs at the School of Infantry. All other infantry jobs are taught in follow-on courses after training in one of the core jobs.

 0300 Basic Infantry Marine – Sgt–Pvt
 *0311 Rifleman – Sgt–Pvt
 0312 Riverine Assault Craft (RAC) Marine (FMOS "Any 03XX") – GySgt–PFC (MOS deleted before 2020)
 0313 Light Armored Reconnaissance Marine – Sgt–Pvt
 0314 Rigid Raiding Craft (RRC)/Rigid Hull Inflatable Boat (RHIB) Coxswain (FMOS) – SSgt–PFC (MOS deleted before 2020)
 0316 Combat Rubber Reconnaissance Craft (CRRC) Coxswain (NMOS 0311, 0321, 0369) – SSgt–PFC
 0317 Scout Sniper (NMOS 0311, 0321, 0331, 0341, 0352, 0369) – GySgt–LCpl
 0321 Reconnaissance Marine – MGySgt–Pvt
 0323 Reconnaissance Marine, Parachute Qualified (NMOS 0321) – MGySgt–Pvt
 0324 Reconnaissance Marine, Combatant Diver Qualified (NMOS 0321) – MGySgt–Pvt
 0326 Reconnaissance Marine, Parachute and Combatant Diver Qualified (NMOS 0321) – MGySgt–Pvt
 0327 Reconnaissance Sniper (NMOS 0321) – MGySgt–LCpl (This MOS is not yet approved by HQMC for award to enlisted Marines, but is retained as a place holder pending formal approval.  It does not appear in NAVMC 1200.1G, MOS Manual, dated 12 May 2021, nor in any other formal message traffic.)
 *0331 Machine Gunner – Sgt–Pvt
 *0341 Mortarman – Sgt–Pvt
 *0351 Infantry Assault Marine – Sgt–Pvt (MOS deleted 30 September 2020)
 *0352 Antitank Missile Gunner – Sgt–Pvt 
 0353 Ontos Crewman (MOS deleted c. 1973)
0363 Light Armored Reconnaissance Unit Leader – GySgt–SSgt (Added 1 October 2017)
 0365 Infantry Squad Leader (NMOS 0311, 0331, 0341, 0352) – Sgt
0367 Light Armored Reconnaissance Master Gunner (NMOS 0313, 0363, 0393) – MGySgt–Sgt (Added 1 October 2017)
 0369 Infantry Unit Leader – GySgt–SSgt
 0372 Critical Skills Operator (CSO) – MGySgt–Sgt
0393 Light Armored Reconnaissance Operations Chief – MGySgt–MSgt (Added 1 October 2017)
 0399 Operations Chief – MGySgt–MSgt
Officer

 0301 Basic Infantry Officer
 0302 Infantry Officer – LtCol–2ndLt
 0303 Light-Armored Reconnaissance (LAR) Officer (NMOS 0302)
 0306 Infantry Weapons Officer – CWO5–CWO2
 0307 Expeditionary Ground Reconnaissance (EGR) Officer (NMOS 0202, 0203, 0302) – LtCol–2ndLt
 0370 Special Operations Officer – LtCol–Capt

04 Logistics 

Enlisted

 0400 Basic Logistics Marine – GySgt–Pvt
 0411 Maintenance Management Specialist – MGySgt–Pvt
 0431 Logistics/Embarkation Specialist – SSgt–Pvt
 0451 Airborne and Air Delivery Specialist – MGySgt–Pvt
 0471 Personnel Retrieval and Processing Specialist – SSgt–Pvt
 0472 Personnel Retrieval and Processing Technician – SSgt–Pvt
 0477 Expeditionary Logistics Instructor (ELI) (NMOS) – MGySgt–GySgt
 0481 Landing Support Specialist – SSgt–Pvt
 0491 Logistics/Mobility Chief – MGySgt–GySgt
Officer

 0401 Basic Logistics Officer
 0402 Logistics Officer – LtCol–2ndLt
 0405 Aerial Delivery Officer (NMOS 0402) – Capt–2ndLt
 0407 Personnel Retrieval and Processing Officer (FMOS) – Capt–2ndLt
 0430 Mobility Officer – LtCol–Capt & CWO5–WO
 0477 Expeditionary Logistics Instructor (NMOS 0402, 3002, 1302) – LtCol–Capt

05 Marine Air-Ground Task Force (MAGTF) Plans 

Enlisted

 0500 Basic MAGTF Marine – GySgt–Pvt
 0511 MAGTF Planning Specialist – MGySgt–Pvt
 0513 Civil Affairs Noncommissioned Officer – GySgt–Cpl (redesignated 0531 Civil Affairs Noncommissioned Officer)
 0521 Psychological Operations (PSYOP) Specialist – MGySgt–Cpl
 0522 Psychological Operations (PSYOP) Non-Commissioned Officer - MGySgt-Cpl
 0531 Civil Affairs Noncommissioned Officer (FMOS)  – GySgt–Cpl
 0532 Civil Affairs Specialist  – MGySgt–Cpl
 0538 Female Engagement Specialist (FMOS) – MGySgt-Cpl
 0539 Civil-Military Operations (CMO) Chief (FMOS) – MGySgt-SSgt
 0551 Information Operations Specialist (NMOS) – MGySgt–Cpl
 0570 Advisor (FMOS) – SgtMaj/MGySgt–Sgt
 0571 Operational Advisor (FMOS) – SgtMaj/MGySgt–Sgt
Officer

 0502 Force Deployment Planning and Execution (FDP&E) Officer (FMOS) – LtCol–Maj
 0505 Operational Planner (FMOS) – LtCol–Maj
 0506 Red Team Member (FMOS) – Col–Capt
 0510 Basic Information Operations Staff Officer (FMOS) – Gen–2ndLt
 0520 Psychological operations (PSYOP) Officer (FMOS) – LtCol–2ndLt
 0530 Civil Affairs Officer (FMOS) – Gen–2ndLt
 0534 Female Engagement Officer (FMOS) - LtCol-1stLt
 0535 Civil-Military Operations (CMO) Planner (FMOS) – LtCol–Maj (new as of April 2017)
 0540 Space Operations Staff Officer (FMOS) – Gen–2ndLt
 0550 Advanced Information Operations (IO) Planner (FMOS) – LtCol–1stLt
 0570 Foreign Security Forces Advisor (FMOS) – Col–1stLt & CWO5–WO
 0571 Advanced Foreign Security Forces Advisor (FMOS) – Col–1stLt & CWO5–WO
 0577 Operations and Tactics Instructor (NMOS) – LtCol–Capt & CWO5–CWO2
 0588 Electromagnetic Spectrum Operations (EMSO) Planner - LtCol–2ndLt

06 Communications 

Enlisted

 0600 Basic Communications Marine
 0612 Tactical Switching Operator - Sgt-Pvt
 0613 Construction Wireman
 0619 Telecommunications Systems Chief – GySgt–SSgt
 0621 Transmission Systems Operator – Sgt–Pvt
 0622 Digital Multi-channel Wideband Transmission Equipment Operator (NMOS) – Sgt–Pvt
 0623 Tropospheric Scatter Transmissions System Operator (NMOS) – Sgt–Pvt
 0626 Fleet SATCOM Terminal Operator - Sgt-Pvt
 0627 Satellite Communications Operator (NMOS) – Sgt–Pvt
 0628 EHF Satellite Communications Operator/Maintainter - Sgt-Pvt
 0629 Transmissions Chief – GySgt–SSgt
 0631 Network Administrator – Sgt–Pvt
 0633 Network Transport Technician (NMOS) – Sgt–Pvt
 0639 Network Chief – GySgt–SSgt
 0648 Spectrum Manager – MSgt–SSgt
 0651 Cyber Network Operator (Transitioned to 0671.) – Sgt–Pvt
 0659 Cyber Network Systems Chief (Split into 0639 & 0679.) – GySgt–SSgt
 0671 Data Systems Administrator – Sgt–Pvt
 0673 Applications Developer (NMOS) – GySgt–Sgt
 0679 Data Systems Chief – GySgt–SSgt
 0681 Information Security Technician – MGySgt–SSgt
 0688 Cyber Security (Transitioned to 1711/1721.)Technician – GySgt–Sgt
 0689 Cybersecurity Chief (Transitioned to 1799.) – MGySgt–MSgt 
 0691 Communications Training Instructor (NMOS) – MGySgt–SSgt
 0699 Communications Chief – MGySgt–MSgt
Officer

 0601 Basic Communications Officer
 0602 Communications Officer – LtCol–2ndLt
 0603 Marine Air-Ground Task Force (MAGTF) Communications Planner (NMOS) – LtCol–Capt
 0605 Cyber Network Operations Officer – LtCol–Capt
 0610 Telecommunications Systems Engineering Officer – CWO5–WO 
 0620 Space and Propagation Engineering Officer (SPEO) – CWO5–WO
 0630 Network Engineering Officer – CWO5–WO
 0640 Strategic Electromagnetic Spectrum Officer – CWO4–WO
 0650 Cyber Network Operations Engineer – CWO5–WO
 0670 Data Systems Engineering Officer – CWO5–WO
 0691 Communications Training Instructor (NMOS) – LtCol–Capt & CWO5–WO

08 Artillery 

Enlisted

 0800 Basic Field Artillery Marine – Sgt–Pvt
 0811 Field Artillery Cannoneer – SSgt–Pvt
 0814 High Mobility Artillery Rocket System (HIMARS) Operator – MGySgt–Pvt
 0842 Field Artillery Radar Operator – Sgt–Pvt
 0844 Field Artillery FDC (Fire Direction Control) Marine – Sgt–Pvt
 0847 Field Artillery Sensor Support Marine – Sgt–Pvt
 0848 Field Artillery FDC Operations Chief – MGySgt–SSgt
 0861 Field Artillery Scout Observer Marine – Sgt–Pvt
 0871 Field Artillery Scout Observer Chief – MGySgt–SSgt
 0869 Artillery Unit Leader - MGySgt-GySgt
Officer

 0801 Basic Field Artillery Officer
 0802 Field Artillery Officer – LtCol–2ndLt
 0803 Target Acquisition Officer – CWO5–WO
 0840 Naval Surface Fire Support Planner – Gen–2ndLt

09 Training 

Enlisted

 0911 Marine Corps Drill Instructor – GySgt–Sgt
 0913 Marine Combat Instructor – GySgt–Cpl
 0914 Marine Special Operations Forces Instructor – MGySgt-Sgt 
 0916 Martial Arts Instructor – MGySgt–Cpl
 0917 Martial Arts Instructor-Trainer – MGySgt–Sgt
 0918 Water Safety/Survival Instructor – MGySgt–Pvt
 0919 Force Fitness Instructor - MSgt-Sgt
 0931 Marksmanship Instructor – MGySgt–Sgt
 0932 Small Arms Weapons Instructor – MGySgt–Sgt
 0933 Marksmanship Coach – Sgt–PFC
 0951 Formal School Instructor - MGySgt-Cpl
Officer

 0919 Force Fitness Instructor Officer - LtCol–2ndLt
 0930 Range Officer – CWO5–WO
 0944 Summer Mountain Leader (FMOS) - Col-Capt
 0946 Summer/Winter Mountain Leader (FMOS) - Col-Capt
 0952 Formal School Officer Instructor (EMOS) - LtCol-1stLt & CWO5-WO
 0953 Formal School Officer Instructor-Fixed Wing Pilot (EMOS) - LtCol-1stLt
 0954 Formal School Officer Instructor-Naval Flight Officer (EMOS) - LtCol-1stLt
 0955 Formal School Officer Instructor-Helicopter Pilot (EMOS) - LtCol-1stLt
 0956 Formal School Instructor-Pilot/Naval Flight Officer (EMOS) - LtCol–2ndLt

11 Utilities 

Enlisted

 1100 Basic Utilities Marine – GySgt–Pvt
 1141 Electrician – SSgt–Pvt
 1142 Electrical Equipment Repair Specialist – SSgt–Pvt
 1143 Utilities Support Technician – SSgt–Pvt
 1161 Refrigeration and Air Conditioning Technician – SSgt–Pvt
 1169 Utilities Chief – MGySgt–GySgt
 1171 Water Support Technician – SSgt–Pvt
 1181 Fabric Repair Specialist - SSgt-Pvt
Officer

 1120 Utilities Officer – CWO5–WO

13 Engineer, Construction, Facilities, & Equipment 

Enlisted

1300 Basic Engineer, Construction, Facilities, & Equipment Marine – GySgt–Pvt
 1316 Metal Worker – SSgt–Pvt
 1341 Engineer Equipment Mechanic – SSgt–Pvt
 1342 Small Craft Mechanic – SSgt–LCpl
 1343 Assault Breacher Vehicle Mechanic – SSgt–LCpl
 1345 Engineer Equipment Operator – SSgt–Pvt
 1349 Engineer Equipment Chief – MGySgt-GySgt
 1361 Engineer Assistant – GySgt–Pvt
 1371 Combat Engineer – MGySgt–Pvt
 1372 Assault Breacher Vehicle Operator – MGySgt–LCpl - Deleted May 2021 
 1391 Bulk Fuel Specialist – MGySgt–Pvt
 1392 Petroleum Quality Assurance and Additization Specialist - Sgt-LCpl
Officer

 1301 Basic Combat Engineer Officer
 1302 Combat Engineer Officer – LtCol–2ndLt
 1310 Engineer Equipment Officer – CWO5–WO
 1330 Facilities Management Officer (FMOS) – Gen–2ndLt
 1390 Bulk Fuel Officer – CWO5–WO

17 Information Maneuver 

Enlisted

 1711 Offensive Cyberspace Warfare Operator – GySgt–SSgt
 1721 Defensive Cyberspace Defensive Warfare Operator – GySgt–Pvt
 1799 Cyberspace Warfare Chief – MGySgt-MSgt
Officer

 1701 Basic Cyberspace Officer
 1702 Cyberspace Officer
 1705 Cyberspace Warfare Development Officer – LtCol–Capt
 1706 Maritime Space Officer - LtCol - Capt
 1707 Influence Officer - LtCol-2ndLt
 1710 Offensive Cyberspace Weapons Officer – CWO5–WO
 1720 Defensive Cyberspace Weapons Officer – CWO5–WO

18 Tank and Assault Amphibious Vehicle 

Enlisted

 1800 Basic Tank and Assault Amphibious Vehicle (AAV) Marine – GySgt–Pvt
 
 1833 Assault Amphibious Vehicle (AAV) Marine – MGySgt–Pvt
 1834 ACV Marine – MGySgt–Pvt
 1868 Assault Amphibious Master Gunner - MGySgt-Sgt
 1869 Senior Armor NCO - MGySgt-GySgt
Officer

 1801 Basic Tank and Amphibious Assault Vehicle Officer
 1802 Tank Officer – LtCol–2ndLt
 1803 Assault Amphibious Vehicle (AAV) Officer – LtCol–2ndLt

21 Ground Ordnance Maintenance 

Enlisted

 2100 Basic Ground Ordnance Maintenance Marine – GySgt–Pvt
 2111 Small Arms Repairer/Technician – GySgt–Pvt
 2112 Precision Weapons Repairer – GySgt–Cpl
 2131 Artillery Systems Technician – GySgt–Pvt
 2141 Assault Amphibious Vehicle (AAV)/Amphibious Combat Vehicle (ACV) Repairer/Technician – GySgt–Pvt
 2146 Heavy Ordnance Vehicle Repairer/Technician – GySgt–Pvt
 2147 Light Armored Vehicle (LAV) Repairer/Technician – GySgt–Pvt
 2148 Expeditionary Fighting Vehicle (EFV) Repairer/Technician – GySgt–Pvt
 2149 Ordnance Vehicle Maintenance Chief – MGySgt–MSgt
 2161 Machinist – GySgt–Pvt
 2171 Electro-Optical Ordnance Repairer/Technician – GySgt–Pvt
 2181 Senior Ground Ordnance Weapons Chief – MGySgt–MSgt
Officer

 2102 Ordnance Officer - LtCol-Capt
 2110 Ordnance Vehicle Maintenance Officer - CWO5-WO
 2120 Weapons Repair Officer - CWO5-WO
 2125 Electro-Optic Instrument Repair Officer - CWO5-WO

23 Ammunition and Explosive Ordnance Disposal 

Enlisted

 2300 Basic Ammunition and Explosive Ordnance Disposal (EOD) Marine – Sgt–Cpl
 2311 Ammunition Technician – MGySgt–Pvt
 2336 Explosive Ordnance Disposal (EOD) Technician – MGySgt-Cpl
Officer

 2305 Explosive Ordnance Disposal Officer - LtCol-Capt & CWO5-WO
 2340 Ammunition Officer - LtCol-Capt & CWO5-WO

25 Communications (OccFld deleted entirely 1 Oct 2005) 

Enlisted

 2500 Basic Communications Marine
 2542 Defense Message System (DMS) Specialist - Sgt-Pvt
 2549 Defense Message System (DMS) Chief - MSgt-SSgt
Officer

 2501 Basic Communications Officer
 2502 Communications Officer - LtCol–2ndLt
 2510 Network Management Officer - CWO5-WO

26 Signals Intelligence/Ground Electronic Warfare 

Enlisted

 2600 Basic Signals Intelligence/Ground Electronic Warfare Operator – GySgt–Pvt
 2611 Cryptologic Cyberspace Analyst (NMOS) – Sgt-LCpl
 2621 Communications/Electronic Warfare Operator – Sgt–Pvt
 2623 Radio Reconnaissance Marine – MGySgt–Pvt
 2629 Signals Intelligence Analyst – MGySgt–Cpl
 2631 Electronic Intelligence (ELINT) Intercept Operator/Analyst – GySgt–Pvt
 2641 Cryptologic Linguist Operator Analyst – Sgt–Pvt
 2642 Advanced Cryptologic Linguist Operator Analyst (NMOS) – Sgt–Pvt
 2643 Cryptologic Linguist - MGySgt-Cpl
 2649 Cryptanalyst – MGySgt-Cpl (MOS deleted 1 Oct 2006.)
 2651 ISR (Intelligence Surveillance Reconnaissance) Systems Engineer – MGySgt–Pvt
 2671 Middle East Cryptologic Linguist - GySgt–Pvt
 2673 Asia-Pacific Cryptologic Linguist - GySgt–Pvt
 2674 European Cryptologic Linguist - GySgt–Pvt
 2676 Central Asian Cryptologic Linguist - GySgt–Pvt
 2691 Signals Intelligence/Electronic Warfare (SIGINT/EW) Chief – MGySgt-MSgt
Officer

 2602 Signals Intelligence/Electronic Warfare (SIGINT/EW) Officer – CWO5–WO

27 Linguist 

Enlisted/Officer (All Linguist MOSs are EMOSs primarily used in conjunction with the 267X primary MOSs that indicate specialized foreign language skills.)

 2799 Military Interpreter/Translator (FMOS) – MGySgt-Pvt (MOS deleted 1 Oct 2016)

Middle East-Africa

 2711 Pakistani Pashtu (EMOS deleted prior to 1 Oct 2012.)
 2712 Arabic (Modern Standard)
 2713 Arabic (Egyptian)
 2714 Arabic (Syrian)
 2715 Arabic (Levantine)
 2716 Amharic
 2717 Arabic (Maghrebi) (EMOS 2717 redesignated from "Hindi" prior to 1 Oct 2012; "Hindi" redesignated to EMOS 2795.)
 2718 Hebrew
 2719 Hindi (Redesignated to EMOS 2795 prior to 1 Oct 2012.)
 2721 Kurdish
 2722 Persian (Redesignated to EMOS 2773/2774 prior to 1 Oct 2012.)
 2723 Somali
 2724 Swahili
 2726 Turkish
 2727 Urdu (Redesignated to EMOS 2775 prior to 1 Oct 2012.)
 2728 Arabic (Iraqi)
 2729 Algerian
 2730 Arabic (Yemeni)
 2731 Arabic (Libyan)Asia-Pacific

 2733 Burmese
 2734 Cambodian
 2735 Cebuano
 2736 Chinese (Cantonese)
 2737 Chinese (Mandarin)
 2738 Indonesian
 2739 Japanese
 2740 Maguindanao
 2741 Korean
 2742 Laotian
 2743 Malay
 2744 Tagalog
 2745 Tausug
 2746 Thai
 2747 Vietnamese
 2748 Maranao
 2749 Yakan
 2772 Afghan Pushtu
 2773 Persian-Afghan (Dari)
 2774 Persian-Farsi (EMOS formerly designated EMOS "2722 Persian.")
 2775 Urdu (EMOS formerly designated EMOS "2727 Urdu.")
 2780 Uzbek
 2785 Azerbaijani
 2795 Hindi (EMOS formerly designated EMOS "2719 Hindi.")
 2796 Bengali (EMOS formerly designated EMOS "2717 Bengali.")European I (West)

 2754 Dutch
 2756 Finnish
 2757 French
 2758 German
 2759 Greek
 2761 Haitian-Creole
 2762 Icelandic (EMOS deleted after 2005, prior to 1 Oct 2012.)
 2763 Italian
 2764 Norwegian
 2766 Portuguese (Brazilian)
 2767 Portuguese (European)
 2768 Spanish
 2769 SwedishEuropean II (East)

 2776 Albanian
 2777 Armenian
 2778 Bulgarian
 2779 Czech
 2781 Estonian
 2782 Georgian
 2783 Hungarian
 2784 Latvian
 2786 Lithuanian
 2787 Macedonian
 2788 Polish
 2789 Romanian
 2791 Russian
 2792 Serb-Croatian
 2793 Slovenian
 2794 Ukrainian

28 Ground Electronics Maintenance 

Enlisted

 2800 Basic Data/Communications Maintenance Marine - GySgt–Pvt
 2811 Telephone Technician - Sgt-Pvt (MOS deleted prior to 1 Oct 2005.)
 2813 Cable Systems Technician (MOS deleted prior to 1 Oct 2005.)
 2814 Telephone Central Office Repairman
 2818 Personal Computer/Tactical Office Machine Repairer (MOS deleted prior to 1 Oct 2005.)
 2821 Technical Controller Marine - Sgt–Pvt (MOS deleted prior to 1 Oct 2005.)
 2822 Electronic Switching Equipment Technician - GySgt-Pvt
 2823 Technical Control Chief - MGySgt–SSgt
 2826 AN/MSC-63A Maintenance Technician (NMOS 2847, 2862) - GySgt-Sgt
 2827 Tactical Electronic Reconnaissance Process/Evaluation Systems (TERPES) Technician (NMOS 2847, 2862) - GySgt-Sgt
 2831 Digital Wideband Systems Maintainer - Sgt–Pvt (formerly designated "AN/TRC-170, Technician/Repairer" before 1 Oct 2012.)
 2832 AN/TRC-170 Technician (NMOS) - GySgt-SSgt (MOS redesignated prior to 1 Oct 2020; previously merged into PMOS 2831, 1 Oct 2005.)
 2833 Fleet Satellite Terminal Technician (NMOS 2834) - GySgt-Sgt (MOS deleted prior to 1 Oct 2020.)
 2834 Satellite Communications (SATCOM) Technician - GySgt-Sgt (MOS deleted prior to 1 Oct 2020.)
 2834 Advanced Extremely High Frequency (AEHF) Technician - GySgt-Sgt (MOS deleted 10 May 2018)
 2841 Ground Electronics Transmission Systems Maintainer - Sgt–Pvt
 2842 Enhanced Position Location Reporting System (EPLRS) System Specialist (MOS deleted prior to 1 Oct 2005.)
 2843 PLRS Support Maintenance Technician (MOS deleted prior to 1 Oct 2005.)
 2844 Ground Communications Organizational Repairer - Sgt-Pvt (MOS deleted prior to 1 Oct 2020.)
 2846 Ground Radio Intermediate Repairer - Sgt-Pvt (MOS deleted prior to 1 Oct 2020.)
 2847 Ground Electronics Telecommunications and Information Systems Maintainer - Sgt-Pvt (MOS formerly designated "Telephone Systems/Personal Computer Repairer.")
 2848 Tactical Remote Sensor System (TRSS) Maintainer (NMOS 2841, 2862) - SSgt–LCpl
 2855 Tactical Electronic Reconnaissance Process/Evaluations System (TERPES) Technician (MOS deleted prior to 1 Oct 2005.)
 2861 Radio Technician (MOS deleted prior to 1 Oct 2005.)	
 2862 Ground Electronics Systems Maintenance Technician - GySgt–Sgt
 2867 AN/TSC-120 Radio Technician (MOS deleted prior to 1 Oct 2005.)
 2871 Calibrations Technician - Sgt–Pvt
 2874 Metrology Technician - MGySgt–Sgt
 2877 Radiac Instrument Technician (MOS deleted prior to 1 Oct 2005.)
 2881 2M/ATE Technician - GySgt-Pvt (MOS deleted prior to 1 Oct 2020.)
 2884 Ground Radar Repairer - Sgt-Pvt
 2887 Artillery Electronics Technician - GySgt–Pvt
 2889 Ground Radar Technician (Deleted prior to 1 Oct 2005.)
 2891 Ground Electronics Systems Maintenance Chief - MGySgt-MSgt
Officer

 2802 Electronics Maintenance Officer (Ground) - LtCol-Capt 
 2805 Electronics Maintenance Officer (Ground) - CWO5-WO
 2810 Telephone Systems Officer - CWO5-WO
 2830 Ground Radar Maintenance Officer - CWO5-WO (MOS deleted prior to 1 Oct 2005.)

30 Supply Chain Material Management 

Enlisted

 3000 Basic Supply Administration and Operations Marine – Sgt–Pvt
 3043 Supply Administration and Operations Specialist – MGySgt–Pvt
 3044 Contract Specialist – MGySgt–Sgt
 3051 Warehouse Clerk – MGySgt–Pvt
 3052 Preservation, Packaging, Packing, and Marking Specialist – MGySgt–Pvt (moved to 3152)
 3072 Aviation Supply Clerk – MGySgt–Pvt
Officer

 3001 Basic Ground Supply Officer
 3002 Ground Supply Officer - LtCol–2ndLt
 3006 Contracting Officer (NMOS 3002) - LtCol-Capt
 3010 Ground Supply Operations Officer - CWO5-WO

31 Distribution Management 

Enlisted

 3100 Basic Distribution Management Marine – SSgt–Pvt
 3112 Distribution Management Specialist – MGySgt–Pvt
 3152 Preservation, Packaging, Packing, and Marketing Specialist – MGySgt–Pvt (moved from MOS 3052)
Officer

 3102 Distribution Management Officer - LtCol-Capt & CWO5-WO

33 Food Service 

Enlisted

 3300 Basic Food Service Marine
 3311 Baker Food Service Marine
 3361 Subsistence Supply Clerk
 3372 Marine Aide-enlisted aide to General and Flag officers
 3381 Food Service Specialist – MGySgt–Pvt
Officer

 3302 Food Service Officer - LtCol-Capt & CWO5-WO

34 Financial Management 

Enlisted

 3400 Basic Financial Management Marine – GySgt–Pvt
 3432 Finance Technician – MGySgt–Pvt
 3441 Non-appropriated fund (NAF) Audit Technician – MGySgt–Sgt
 3451 Fiscal/Budget Technician – MGySgt–Pvt
Officer

 3401 Basic Financial Management Officer
 3402 Finance Officer - CWO5-WO
 3404 Financial Management Officer - LtCol–2ndLt
 3406 Financial Accounting Officer (MOS deleted prior to 1 Oct 2012.)
 3408 Financial Management Resource Officer - CWO5-WO
 3410 Non-appropriated fund (NAF) Auditing Officer(II/III) (PMOS deleted prior to 1 Oct 2012.)
 3450 Planning, Programming, Budgeting and Execution (PPBE) Officer (FMOS) - LtCol-Capt

35 Motor Transport 

Enlisted

 3500 Basic Motor Transport Marine – GySgt–Pvt
 3513 Body Repair Mechanic
 3521 Automotive Organizational Technician – Sgt–Pvt
 3522 Automotive Intermediate Mechanic – Sgt–LCpl
 3523 Vehicle Recovery Mechanic – Sgt –  Pfc
 3524 Fuel and Electrical Systems Mechanic – Sgt–LCpl
 3525 Crash/Fire/Rescue Vehicle Mechanic – GySgt–LCpl
 3529 Motor Transport Maintenance Chief – MGySgt–SSgt
 3531 Motor Vehicle Operator – Sgt–Pvt
 3533 Logistics Vehicle Systems Operator – Sgt–Pvt
 3534 Semitrailer Refueler Operator – Sgt–LCpl
 3536 Vehicle Recovery Operator – Sgt–Pvt
 3537 Motor Transport Operations Chief – MGySgt–SSgt
 3538 Licensing Examiner – GySgt–Sgt
 3599 1stSgt Select - GySgt dead to community 
Officer

 3501 Basic Motor Transport Officer (MOS deleted c. 2000)
 3502 Motor Transport Officer - LtCol–2ndLt (PMOS 3502 merged into PMOS 0402 c. 2000)
 3510 Motor Transport Maintenance Officer - CWO5-WO

40 Data Systems (OccFld deleted after 1 Oct 2005)  

Enlisted

 4000 Basic Data Systems Marine
 4066 Small Computer Systems Specialist (SCSS) - MSgt-Pvt
 4067 Programmer, ADA
 4076 Computer Security Specialist - MGySgt-Cpl
 4099 Data Processing Chief - MGySgt-MSgt
Officer

 4010 Data Systems Managemeent Officer

41 Morale Welfare and Recreation 

Enlisted

 4100 Basic Marine Corps Community Services Marine – SSgt–Sgt
 4133 Morale, Welfare, Recreation (MWR) Specialist – MGySgt–Sgt
Officer

 4130 Marine Corps Community Services (MCCS) Officer - CWO5-WO

43 Public Affairs 

Enlisted

 4300 Basic Combat Correspondent – LCpl-Pvt
 4312 Basic Military Journalism – Sgt-Pvt
 4313 Broadcast Journalist – MGySgt–Pvt
 4341 Combat Correspondent – MGySgt–Pvt
Officer

 4301 Basic Public Affairs Officer
4302 Public Affairs Officer - LtCol–2ndLt (converted to 4502)
 4305 Mass Communication Specialist (NMOS 4302)
 4330 Historical Officer (deleted before 1 Oct 2012)

44 Legal Services 

Enlisted

 4400 Basic Legal Services Marine – GySgt–Pvt
 4421 Legal Services Specialist – MGySgt–Pvt
 4422 Legal Services Court Reporter – MGySgt-Cpl
Officer

 4401 Student Judge Advocate
 4402 Judge Advocate - Col–2ndLt
 4405 Master of International Law (NMOS 4402)
 4406 Master of Environmental Law (NMOS 4402)
 4407 Master of Labor Law (NMOS 4402)
 4408 Master of Procurement Law (NMOS 4402)
 4409 Master of Criminal Law (NMOS 4402)
 4410 Master of Law (General) (NMOS 4402)
 4411 Military Judge (NMOS 4402) - Col-Maj
 4417 Master of Cyber, Intelligence, and Information Law (NMOS 4402) – LtCol–Maj
 4430 Legal Administrative Officer – CWO5–WO

45 Communication Strategy and Operations 

Enlisted

 4500 Basic Communication Strategy & Operations Marine – Sgt–Pvt
 4511 Recruiting Station Marketing & Communication Marine - Sgt
 4512 Combat Graphics Specialist – Sgt–Pvt
 4513 Advanced Visual Information-Graphics Marine (NMOS) – Sgt
 4531 Combat Mass Communicator – Sgt–Pvt
 4541 Combat Photographer – Sgt–Pvt
 4543 Advanced Visual Information-Photojournalism Marine (NMOS) – Sgt
 4571 Combat Videographer – Sgt–Pvt
 4573 Advanced Visual Information-Motion Media Marine (NMOS) – Sgt
 4591 Communication and Strategy Operations Chief – MGySgt–SSgt

Officer

 Basic Communication Strategy & Operations Officer
 4502 Communication Strategy & Operations Officer (PMOS) — LtCol–2ndLt
 4503 Visual Information Officer (PMOS) – Capt–WO 
 4505 Communication Strategy & Operations Planner (NMOS 4502) - LtCol-Capt

46 Combat Camera (COMCAM) 

Enlisted

 4600 Basic Combat Camera Marine – SSgt–Pvt
 4612 Production Specialist – SSgt–Pvt
 4616 Reproduction Equipment Repairman – SSgt-Cpl
 4641 Combat Photographer – SSgt–Pvt
 4671 Combat Videographer – SSgt–Pvt
 4691 Combat Camera Chief- MGySgt-GySgt

Officer

4602 Combat Camera (COMCAM) Officer - LtCol-Capt & CWO5-WO (Redesignated to PMOS 4503; redesignated from "Combat Visual Information" 1 Oct 2005.)
 4606 Combat Artist (Officer) (FMOS)

48 Recruiting and Retention Specialist 

Enlisted

 4821 Career Retention Specialist (PMOS) – MGySgt–Sgt
Officer

 4801 Recruiting Officer, Marine Corps Total Force Expert (FMOS) - LtCol-1stLt
 4802 Recruiting Officer, Operational Expert (FMOS) - LtCol-1stLt
 4803 Recruiting Officer, Officer Procurement Expert (FMOS) - LtCol-1stLt
 4804 Recruiting Officer, Multiple Tour Expert (FMOS 4801, 4802, 4803) - Col-Capt
 4810 Recruiting Officer – CWO5–WO

55 Music 

Enlisted

 5500 Basic Musician – GySgt–Pvt
 5511 Member, The President's Own, United States Marine Band (PMOS)
 5512 Member, The Commandant's Own, United States Marine Drum and Bugle Corps (PMOS)
 5517 Bandmaster - MGySgt–MSgt
 5519 Enlisted Conductor – GySgt–SSgt
 5521 Drum Major – GySgt–SSgt
 5522 Small Ensemble Leader – GySgt–SSgt
 5523 Instrument Repair Technician – MGySgt–SSgt
 5524 Musician – GySgt–Pvt
 55XX skill designators for 5524:
 5526 Oboe
 5528 Bassoon
 5534 Clarinet
 5536 Flute/Piccolo
 5537 Saxophone
 5541 Trumpet
 5543 Euphonium
 5544 Horn
 5546 Trombone
 5547 Tuba/Sousaphone
 5548 Electric Bass
 5563 Percussion (Drums, Timpani, and Mallets)
 5565 Piano
 5566 Guitar
 5567 Arranger, Band

The following MOSs apply only to the Drum and Bugle Corps:

 5571 Drum and Bugle Corps Drum Major
 5574 Soprano or Mellophone Bugle
 5576 French horn Bugle
 5577 Bass Baritone Bugle
 5579 Contrabass Bugle
 5592 Drum and Bugle Corps Arranger
 5593 Percussion
Officer

 5502 Band Officer - CWO5-WO
 5505 Director/Assistant Director, The President's Own, U.S. Marine Band - Col-1stLt
 5506 Staff Officer, The President's U.S. Own Marine Band - LtCol-Capt & CWO5-WO
 5507 U.S. Marine Drum and Bugle Corps Officer - LtCol-1stLt

57 Chemical, Biological, Radiological, and Nuclear (CBRN) Defense 
Formally known as Nuclear, Biological and Chemical Defense (NBCD)

Enlisted

 5700 Basic Chemical, Biological, Radiological, and Nuclear (CBRN) Defense Marine – SSgt–Pvt
 5711 Chemical, Biological, Radiological, and Nuclear (CBRN) Defense Specialist – Sgt–Pvt
 5713 Chemical, Biological, Radiological, and Nuclear (CBRN) Responder – Sgt–Pvt
 5769 Chemical, Biological, Radiological, and Nuclear (CBRN) Defense Chief - MGySgt-SSgt
Officer

 5701 Basic CBRN Defense Officer 
 5702 Chemical, Biological, Radiological and Nuclear (CBRN) Defense Officer - CWO5-WO

58 Military Police and Corrections 

Enlisted

 5800 Basic Military Police and Corrections Marine – GySgt–Pvt
 5811 Military Police – MGySgt–Pvt.
 5812 Working Dog Handler – SSgt–Pvt
 5813 Accident Investigator – GySgt-Cpl
 5814 Physical Security Specialist – GySgt-Cpl
 5815 Special Reaction Team (SRT) Member – GySgt-Cpl
 5819 Military Police Investigator – GySgt-Cpl
 5821 Criminal Investigator CID Agent – MGySgt–Sgt
 5822 Forensic Psycho-physiologist (Polygraph Examiner) – MGySgt–SSgt
 5831 Correctional Specialist – MGySgt–Pvt
 5832 Correctional Counselor – MGySgt–Sgt
Officer

 5801 Basic Military Police and Corrections Officer
 5803 Military Police Officer – LtCol–2ndLt
 5804 Corrections Officer – CWO5–WO
 5805 Criminal Investigation Officer – CWO5–WO

59 Aviation Command and Control (C2) Electronics Maintenance 

Enlisted

 5900 Basic Electronics Maintenance Marine
 5912 Avenger System Maintainer – MSgt–Pvt
 5937 Aviation Radio Repairer - Sgt-Pvt (Merged into PMOS 5939, 1 Oct 2005.)
 5939 Aviation Communication Systems Technician (AVCOMMSYSTECH) – GySgt–Pvt
 5941 Aviation Primary Surveillance Radar Repair Man – MSgt–Pvt
 5942 Aviation Radar Repairer – Sgt–Pvt (Deleted - merged into MOS 5948) 
 5948 Aviation Radar Technician – GySgt – Sgt
 5951 Aviation Meteorological Equipment Technician, OMA/IMA
 5952 Air Traffic Control Navigational Aids Technician – GySgt–Pvt
 5953 Air Traffic Control Radar Technician – GySgt–Pvt
 5954 Air Traffic Control Communications Technician – GySgt–Pvt
 5959 Air Traffic Control Systems Maintenance Chief – MGySgt-MSgt
 5962 Tactical Data Systems Equipment (TDSE) Repairer – Sgt–Pvt
 5963 Tactical Air Operations Module Repairer (merged into PMOS 5979, 1 Oct 2005.)
 5974 Tactical Data Systems Technician – GySgt–Pvt
 5977 Weapons and Tactics Instructor-Aviation Command & Control (AC2) Maintenance Chief – MSgt–GySgt
 5979 Tactical Air Operations/Air Defense Systems Technician – GySgt–Pvt
 5993 Electronics Maintenance Chief (Aviation C2) – MGySgt-MSgt

Officer

 5902 Electronics Maintenance Officer Aviation Command and Control (C2) - LtCol-Capt
 5910 Aviation Radar System Maintenance Officer - CWO5-WO (Redesignated from PMOS "Aviation Radar Maintenance Officer" 1 Oct 2012.)
 5950 Air Traffic Control Systems Maintenance Officer - CWO5-WO
 5970 Tactical Data Systems Maintenance Officer - CWO5-WO

60/61/62 Aircraft Maintenance 

Enlisted
 3215 Basic Aircraft Maintenance Marine – GySgt–Pvt
 6011 Aviation Production Controller - MSgt-Sgt
 6012 Aviation Maintenance Controller – MSgt–Sgt
 6016 Collateral Duty Inspector (CDI) - MGySgt-Cpl
 6017 Collateral Duty Quality Assurance Representative (CDQAR) - GySgt-Cpl
 6018 Quality Assurance Representative (QAR) – MSgt-Sgt
 6019 Aircraft Maintenance Chief – MGySgt-MSgt
 6023 Aircraft Power Plants Test Cell Operator – GySgt-Cpl
 6033 Aircraft Nondestructive Inspection Technician – GySgt-Cpl
 6042 Aviation Support Equipment Asset Manager (PMOS) - MGySgt-Pvt
 6043 Aircraft Welder – GySgt–LCpl
 6044 Additive Manufacturing Specialist - MSgt-Cpl
 6046 Aircraft Maintenance Data Specialist – MGySgt–Pvt
 6048 Flight Equipment Technician – GySgt–Pvt (Formerly MOS 6060)
 6049 NALCOMIS Application Administrator/Analyst – MGySgt–Sgt
 6061 Aircraft Intermediate Level Hydraulic/Pneumatic Mechanic-Trainee – GySgt–Pvt
 6062 Aircraft Intermediate Level Hydraulic/Pneumatic Mechanic – GySgt–Pvt
 6071 Aircraft Maintenance Support Equipment (SE) Mechanic-Trainee – GySgt–Pvt
 6072 Aircraft Maintenance Support Equipment (SE) Hydraulic/Pneumatic/Structures Mechanic – GySgt–Pvt (MOS deleted 1 Oct. 2016)
 6073 Aircraft Maintenance Support Equipment (SE) Electrician/Refrigeration Mechanic – GySgt–Pvt
 6074 Cryogenics Equipment Operator – GySgt–Pvt
 6077 Weapons and Tactics Instructor - MGySgt-MSgt
 6091 Aircraft Intermediate Level Structures Mechanic-Trainee – GySgt–Pvt
 6092 Aircraft Intermediate Level Structures Mechanic – GySgt–Pvt
 6100 Helicopter/Tiltrotor Mechanic-Trainee – GySgt–Pvt
 6112 Helicopter Mechanic, CH-46 – GySgt–Pvt
 6113 Helicopter Mechanic, CH-53 – GySgt–Pvt
 6114 Helicopter Mechanic, UH/AH-1 – GySgt–Pvt
 6116 Tiltrotor Mechanic, MV-22 – GySgt–Pvt
 6122 Helicopter Power Plants Mechanic, T-58 – GySgt–Pvt
 6123 Helicopter Power Plants Mechanic, T-64 – GySgt–Pvt
 6124 Helicopter Power Plants Mechanic, T-400/T-700 – GySgt–Pvt
 6132 Helicopter/Tiltrotor Dynamic Components Mechanic – GySgt–Pvt
 6151 Helicopter/Tiltrotor Airframe Mechanic-Trainee – GySgt–Pvt
 6152 Helicopter Airframe Mechanic, CH-46 – GySgt–Pvt
 6153 Helicopter Airframe Mechanic, CH-53 – GySgt–Pvt
 6154 Helicopter Airframe Mechanic, UH/AH-1 – GySgt–Pvt 6156 Tiltrotor Airframe Mechanic, MV-22 – GySgt–Pvt
 6162 Presidential Support Specialist – MGySgt–LCpl
 6171 Night Systems Instructor (NSI) Enlisted Aircrew - MGySgt-LCpl
 6172 Helicopter Crew Chief, CH-46 – GySgt–Pvt
 6173 Helicopter Crew Chief, CH-53 – GySgt–Pvt
 6174 Helicopter Crew Chief, UH-1N/Y – GySgt–Pvt
 6176 Tiltrotor Crew Chief, MV-22 – GySgt–Pvt
 6177 Weapons and Tactics Crew Chief Instructor – MGySgt–LCpl
 6178 VH-60N Presidential Helicopter Crew Chief – MGySgt–LCpl
 6179 VH-3D Presidential Helicopter Crew Chief – MGySgt–LCpl
 6181 VH-92 Presidential Helicopter Crew Chief - MGySgt-LCpl
 6199 Enlisted Aircrew/Aerial Observer/Gunner – MGySgt–Pvt
 6211 Fixed-wing Aircraft Mechanic-Trainee – GySgt–Pvt
 6212 Fixed-Wing Aircraft Mechanic, AV-8/TAV-8 – GySgt–Pvt
 6213 Fixed-Wing Aircraft Mechanic, EA-6 – GySgt–Pvt
 6214 Unmanned Aerial Vehicle (UAV) Mechanic – GySgt–Pvt
 6216 Fixed-Wing Aircraft Mechanic, KC-130 – GySgt–Pvt
 6217 Fixed-Wing Aircraft Mechanic, F/A-18 – GySgt–Pvt
 6218 Fixed-Wing Aircraft Mechanic, F35 - GySgt-Pvt
 6222 Fixed-Wing Aircraft Power Plants Mechanic, F-402 – GySgt–Pvt
 6223 Fixed-Wing Aircraft Power Plants Mechanic, J-52 – GySgt–Pvt
 6226 Fixed-Wing Aircraft Power Plants Mechanic, T-56 – GySgt–LCpl
 6227 Fixed-wing Aircraft Power Plants Mechanic, F-404 – GySgt–Pvt
 6242 Fixed-Wing Aircraft Flight Engineer, KC-130 – MGySgt–Sgt
 6243 Fixed-Wing Transport Aircraft Specialist, C-9 – MGySgt–LCpl
 6244 Fixed-Wing Transport Aircraft Specialist, C-12 – MGySgt–PFC
 6246 Fixed-Wing Transport Aircraft Specialist, C-20 – MGySgt–LCpl
 6247 Fixed-Wing Transport Aircraft Specialist, UC-35 – MGySgt–LCpl
 6251 Fixed-Wing Aircraft Airframe Mechanic-Trainee – GySgt–Pvt
 6252 Fixed-Wing Aircraft Airframe Mechanic, AV-8/TAV-8 – GySgt–Pvt
 6253 Fixed-Wing Aircraft Airframe Mechanic, EA-6 – GySgt–Pvt
 6256 Fixed-Wing Aircraft Airframe Mechanic, KC-130 – GySgt–Pvt
 6257 Fixed-Wing Aircraft Airframe Mechanic, F/A-18 – GySgt–Pvt
 6258 Fixed-Wing Aircraft Airframe Mechanic, F-35 – GySgt–Pvt
 6276 Fixed-Wing Aircraft Loadmaster, KC-130 – MGySgt–Pvt
 6281 Fixed-Wing Aircraft Safety Equipment Mechanic- Trainee – GySgt–Pvt
 6282 Fixed-Wing Aircraft Safety Equipment Mechanic, AV-8/TAV-8 – GySgt–Pvt
 6283 Fixed-Wing Aircraft Safety Equipment Mechanic, EA-6 – GySgt–Pvt
 6286 Fixed-Wing Aircraft Safety Equipment Mechanic, KC-130 – GySgt–Pvt
 6287 Fixed-Wing Aircraft Safety Equipment Mechanic, F/A-18 – GySgt–Pvt
 6288 Fixed-Wing Aircraft Safety Equipment Mechanic, F-35 - GySgt-Pvt   

Officer

 6001 Basic Aircraft Maintenance Officer
 6002 Aircraft Maintenance Officer - LtCol–2ndLt
 6004 Aircraft Maintenance Engineer Officer - LtCol-Capt & CWO5-WO
 6044 Additive Manufacturing Officer - Maj-2ndLt
 6077 Weapons and Tactics Instructor - LtCol–2ndLt & CWO5-WO

63/64 Avionics 

Enlisted
 6311 Aircraft Communications/Navigation/Electrical/Weapon Systems Technician-Trainee, OMA
 6312 Aircraft Communications/Navigation/Weapon Systems Technician, AV-8 (Deleted - merged into MOS 6332)
 6313 Aircraft Communications/Navigation/Radar Systems Technician, EA-6
 6314 Unmanned Aerial Vehicle (UAV) Avionics Technician
 6316 Aircraft Communications/Navigation Systems Technician, KC-130
 6317 Aircraft Communications/Navigation Systems Technician, F/A-18
 6322 Aircraft Communications/Navigation/Electrical Systems Technician, CH-46 (MOS deleted 1 Oct. 2016)
 6323 Aircraft Communications/Navigation/Electrical Systems Technician, CH-53
 6324 Aircraft Communications/Navigation/Electrical/Weapon Systems Technician, U/AH-1
 6326 Aircraft Communications/Navigation/Electrical/Weapon Systems Technician, V-22
 6331 Aircraft Electrical Systems Technician-Trainee
 6332 Aircraft Electrical Systems Technician, AV-8
 6333 Aircraft Electrical Systems Technician, EA-6
 6336 Aircraft Electrical Systems Technician, KC-130
 6337 Aircraft Electrical Systems Technician, F/A-18
 6338 Aircraft Avionics Technician, F-35
 6344 Aircraft Electric Systems Technician, UH-1N/AH-1T
 6365 Aircraft Communications/Navigation/DECM/Radar Systems Technician, EA-6B
 6386 Aircraft Electronic Countermeasures Systems Technician, EA-6B
 6391 Avionics Maintenance Chief
 6411 Aircraft Communications/Navigation Systems Technician- Trainee, IMA
 6412 Aircraft Communications Systems Technician, IMA
 6413 Aircraft Navigation Systems Technician, IFF/RADAR/TACAN, IMA
 6414 Advanced Aircraft Communications/Navigation Systems Technician, IMA (Deleted - merged into MOS 6483)
 6422 Aircraft Cryptographic Systems Technician, IMA 6423 Aviation Electronic Microminiature/Instrument and Cable Repair Technician, IMA
 6431 Aircraft Electrical Systems Technician-Trainee
 6432 Aircraft Electrical/Instrument/Flight Control Systems Technician, Fixed Wing, IMA
 6433 Aircraft Electrical/Instrument/flight Control Systems Technician, Helicopter, IMA (Deleted - merged into MOS 6432)
 6434 Advanced Aircraft Electrical/Instrument/Flight Control Systems Technician, IMA
 6461 Hybrid Test Set Technician, IMA
 6462 Avionics Test Set (ATS) Technician, IMA
 6463 Radar Test Station (RTS)/Radar Systems Test Station (RSTS) Technician, IMA
 6464 Aircraft Inertial Navigation System Technician, IMA
 6466 Aircraft Forward Looking Infrared/Electro-Optical Technician - Sgt-Pvt
 6467 Consolidated Automatic Support System (CASS) Technician, IMA
 6468 Aircraft Electrical Equipment Test Set (EETS)/Mobile Electronic Test Set (METS) Technician
 6469 Advanced Automatic Test Equipment Technician, IMA
 6482 Aircraft Electronic Countermeasures Systems Technician, Fixed Wing, IMA
 6483 Aircraft Electronic Countermeasures Systems Technician, Helicopter, IMA
 6484 Aircraft Electronic Countermeasures Systems/RADCOM/CAT IIID Technician, IMA
 6486 Advanced Aircraft Electronic Countermeasures Technician, IMA
 6491 Aviation Precision Measurement Equipment (PME) Chief
 6492 Aviation Precision Measurement Equipment/Calibration and Repair Technician, IMA
 6493 Aviation Meteorological Equipment Technician
 6499 Mobile Facilities Technician – GySgt-Cpl

Officer

 6302 Avionics Officer - LtCol-Capt & CWO5-WO

65 Aviation Ordnance 

Enlisted

 6500 Basic Aviation Ordnance Marine
 6511 Aviation Ordnance Trainee - GySgt-Pvt
 6516, Ordnance Quality Assurance/Safety Observer (NMOS) - MGySgt-Cpl
 6521 Aviation Ordnance Munitions Technician, IMA
 6531 Aircraft Ordnance Technician – SSgt-Pvt (Organizational/Squadron Level)
 6541 Aviation Ordnance Systems Technician – SSgt-Pvt (Intermediate/Equipment Maintenance Level)
 6542 Ammunition Inventory Management Specialist - SSgt-LCpl (NMOS)
 6577 Aviation Ordnance Weapons and Tactics Instructor - MGySgt-Sgt
 6591 Aviation Ordnance Chief – MGySgt-GySgt (Organizational/Intermediate Level) [See Note]
Officer

 6502 Aviation Ordnance Officer - LtCol-Capt & CWO5-WO
 6577 Aviation Ordnance Weapons and Tactics Instructor - LtCol-Capt & CWO5-WO

66 Aviation Logistics 

Enlisted

 6600 Basic Aviation Supply Marine
 6613 Radio Communication and Navigation Systems Technician on Utility Aircraft 
 6617 Enlisted Aviation Logistician – GySgt–Pvt
 6672 Aviation Supply Specialist – MGySgt–Pvt
 6673 Automated Information Systems (AIS) Computer Operator
 6694 Aviation Logistics Information Management System (ALIMS) Specialists – MGySgt–Pvt
Officer

 6601 Basic Aviation Logistics Officer
 6602 Aviation Supply Officer - LtCol–2ndLt
 6604 Aviation Supply Operations Officer - CWO5-WO
 6607 Aviation Logistician (NMOS 6002, 6302, 6502, 6602)
 6608 AIRSpeed Officer (NMOS) (Added new prior to 1 Oct 2012.)
 6677 Weapons and Tactics Instructor-Aviation Logistician

68 Meteorological and Oceanographic (METOC) 

Enlisted

 6800 Basic Meteorology & Oceanography (METOC) Marine 
 6821 METOC Observer – Cpl-Pvt (MOS deleted prior to 1 Oct 2012.)
 6842 METOC Analyst Forecaster – MGySgt–Pvt
 6852 METOC Impact Analyst – MGySgt-Cpl
Officer

 6802 Meteorology and Oceanography (METOC) Officer - LtCol-Capt and CWO5-WO 
 6877 Weapons and Tactics Instructor-METOC (Added new after 1 Oct 2012.)

70 Airfield Services 

Enlisted

 7000 Basic Airfield Services Marine - MGySgt-Pvt
 7011 Expeditionary Airfield Systems Technician – MGySgt–Pvt
 7041 Aviation Operations Specialist – MGySgt–Pvt
 7051 Aircraft Rescue and Firefighting Specialist – MGySgt–Pvt
Officer

 7002 Expeditionary Airfield and Emergency Services Officer - CWO5-WO
 7077 Weapons and Tactics Instructor - Aviation Ground Support (Added new after 1 Oct 2012.)

72 Air Control/Air Support/Anti-air Warfare/Air Traffic Control 

Enlisted

 7200 Basic Air Control/Air Support/Antiair Warfare/Air Traffic Control Marine
 72X1 Air Control/Air Support/Anti-Air Warfare Trainee
 7212 Low Altitude Air Defense Gunner
 7222 Hawk Missile Operator
7234 Air Control Electronics Operator (Deleted - merged into MOS 7236)
 7236 Tactical Air Defense Controller
 7242 Air Support Operations Operator
 7251 Air Traffic Controller – Trainee
 7252 Air Traffic Controller – Tower
 7253 Air Traffic Controller–Radar Arrival/Departure Controller – 
 7254 Air Traffic Controller–Radar Approach Controller (NMOS) – GySt-Pvt
 7257 Air Traffic Controller – SSgt-Pvt
 7276 Low Altitude Air Defense (LAAD) Enhancement Training Instructor (LETI) - GySgt-Sgt
 7291 Senior Air Traffic Controller – MGySgt–GySgt
Officer

 7201 Basic Air Control/Air Support/Antiair Warfare/Air Traffic Control Officer
 7202 Air Command and Control Officer - LtCol-Maj
 7204 Low Altitude Air Defense Officer - Capt-2ndLt
 7207 Forward Air Controller/Air Officer (Redesignated FMOS 7502 prior to 1 Oct 2012.)
 7208 Air Support Control Officer - Capt-2ndLt
 7210 Air Defense Control Officer - Capt-2ndLt
 7220 Air Traffic Control Officer - Capt-2ndLt
 7237 Senior Air Director (SAD) (NMOS) (NMOS 7210) (Added new prior to 1 Oct 2012.)
 7276 Low Altitude Air Defense (LAAD) Enhancement Training Instructor (LETI) - Capt-2ndLt
 7277 Weapons and Tactics Instructor Air Control (NMOS) (NMOS 7277 redesignated as FMOS 8077 on 1 Oct. 2012)

73 Navigation Officer/Enlisted Flight Crews 

Enlisted

 7300 Basic Enlisted Flight Crew Marine - MGySgt-Pvt
 73X1 Air Traffic Control & Enlisted Flight Crews Trainee
 7307 Unmanned Aircraft System (UAS) Operator, RQ-7 - Sgt-Pvt (MOS deleted 1 Oct. 2016)
 7313 Helicopter Specialist, AH-1Z/UH-1Y – MGySgt-Pvt
 7321 Unmanned Aircraft System (UAS) Operator, MQ-21 - Sgt-Pvt
 7314 Unmanned Aerial Vehicle (UAV) Air Vehicle Operator – MGySgt-Pvt
 7316 Small Unmanned Aerial System (SUAS) Operator - MGySgt-Pvt
 7371 Tactical Systems Operator-Trainee
 7372 Tactical Systems Operator/Mission Specialist
 7381 Airborne Radio Operator / In-flight Refueling Observer / Loadmaster Trainee (ARO / IRO / LM)
 7382 Airborne Radio Operator/In-flight Refueling Observer/Loadmaster
Officer

 7301 Basic Navigation Officer
 7315 Group 3 UAS MAGTF Officer - LtCol–2ndLt
 7318 VMU MQ-9 Officer - LtCol–2ndLt 
 7380 Tactical Systems Officer/Mission Specialist

75 Pilots/Naval Flight Officers (All MOS in this OccFld are Unrestricted Line Officer-only) 

Officer

 7500 Pilot VMA, FRS Basic A-4M (MOS deleted before 1 Oct. 2013)
 7501 Pilot VMA, A-4 Qualified (MOS deleted before 1 Oct. 2013)
 7502 Forward Air Controller/Air Officer (FMOS) - Col–2ndLt
 7503 Billet Designator - Fixed-Wing Pilot (FMOS) - LtCol–2ndLt
 7504 Billet Designator - Naval Flight Officer (FMOS) - LtCol–2ndLt
 7505 Billet Designator - Helicopter Pilot (FMOS) - LtCol–2ndLt
 7506 Billet Designator - Any Pilot/Naval Flight Officer (FMOS) - LtCol–2ndLt
 7507 Pilot VMA, FRS Basic AV-8B Pilot
 7508 Pilot VMA, AV-8A/C Qualified (MOS deleted 1 Oct. 2012)
 7509 Pilot VMA, AV-8B Qualified
 7510 Pilot VMA (AW), A-6E FRS Basic (MOS deleted 1 Oct. 2013)
 7511 Pilot Helicopter CH53K (NMOS 7566) - LtCol–2ndLt (Formerly Pilot VMA (AW), A-6E Qualified, MOS deleted 1 Oct. 2013)
 7513 Pilot, Helicopter, AH-1Z/UH-1Y (NMOS 7563, 7565) - LtCol–2ndLt
 7516 Pilot VMFA, FRS Basic F-35B Pilot - LtCol–2ndLt
 7517 VH-92/71, Presidential Helicopter Pilot (NMOS "Any PMOS 756X," 7532) - Col-Capt
 7518 Pilot VMFA, F-35B Qualified
 7521 Pilot VMFA, F/A-18 FRS Basic
 7522 Pilot VMFA, F-4S Qualified (MOS deleted 1 Oct. 2013)
 7523 Pilot VMFA, F/A-18 Qualified
 7524 Naval Flight Officer (NFO) Weapons Systems Officer (WSO), F/A-18D FRS Basic
 7525 Naval Flight Officer (NFO) Weapons Systems Officer (WSO), F/A-18D Qualified
 7527 Pilot VMFA, F/A-18D Qualified (NMOS 7523) (MOS merged with MOS 7523, deleted 1 Oct. 2012)
 7531 Pilot VMM, V-22 FRS Basic
 7532 Pilot VMM, V-22 Qualified
 7533 Aircraft Section Lead (SL) (NMOS) - Col–2ndLt
 7534 Aircraft Division Lead (DL) Qualification (NMOS) - Col–2ndLt
 7535 Flight Leader (FL) Qualification (NMOS) - Col–2ndLt
 7536 AV-8B Weapons Training Officer (WTO) Qualification (NMOS 7509, 8042) - Col–2ndLt
 7537 Marines Division Tactics Course (MDTC) Qualification (NMOS 7518, 7523, 7525, 8042) - Col–2ndLt
 7538 EA-6B Defensive Tactics Instructor (DEFTACTI) Qualification (NMOS 7543, 7588, 8042) - Col–2ndLt
 7539 AV-8B Air Combat Tactics Instructor (ACTI) Qualification (NMOS 7509, 8042) - Col–2ndLt 
 7541 Pilot VMAQ, EA-6B FRS Basic (MOS deleted 1 Oct. 2013)
 7542 Strike Fighter Tactics Instructor (NMOS 7518, 7523, 7525) (Previously redesignated after 1 Oct 2012 from "PMOS 7542 Pilot VMAQ/VMFP, EA-6A Qualified") - Col–2ndLt
 7543 Pilot VMAQ, EA-6B Qualified
 7544 Forward Air Controller (Airborne) Instructor (FAC(A)I) Qualification (NMOS) - Col–2ndLt
 7545 Pilot VMAQ/VMFP, RF-4B Qualified (MOS deleted prior to 1 Oct. 2013)
 7547 Night Systems Instructor (NSI) Qualification (NMOS) - Col–2ndLt
 7550 Pilot VMGR, Maritime Advance (NATC) - LtCol–2ndLt (MOS deleted after 1 Oct. 2012)
 7551 Pilot VMR, C-9 Qualified (FMOS) - LtCol–2ndLt
 7552 Pilot VMR, TC-4C Qualified (MOS deleted prior to 1 Oct. 2013) 7553 Pilot, VMR C-20/C-37 Qualified (FMOS) - LtCol–2ndLt
 7554 Pilot VMR, UC-35 Qualified (FMOS) - LtCol–2ndLt
 7555 Pilot VMR, UC-12B Qualified (FMOS) - LtCol–2ndLt
 7556 Pilot VMGR, KC-130 Co-Pilot (T2P/T3P)
 7557 Pilot VMGR, KC-130 Aircraft Commander
 7558 Pilot HMH/M/L/A, FRS Basic CH-53D - LtCol–2ndLt (PMOS deleted 1 Oct. 2012)
 7559 Pilot VMGR/VT, CT-39 Qualified (FMOS) (MOS deleted prior to 1 Oct. 2013) - LtCol–2ndLt
 7560 Pilot HMH, FRS Basic/CH-53E Pilot
 7561 Pilot HMH/M/L/A, CH-46 FRS Basic (MOS deleted 1 Oct 2016)
 7562 Pilot HML/M/L/A, CH-46 Qualified
 7563 Pilot HMLA, UH-1Y Qualified
 7564 Pilot HMH, CH-53 A/D Qualified
 7565 Pilot HMLA, AH-1 Qualified
 7566 Pilot HMH, CH-53E Qualified
 7567 Pilot HMLA, FRS Basic UH-1Y
 7568 Pilot HMLA, FRS Basic AH-1
 7570 VH-60N Presidential Helicopter Pilot Qualified (NMOS) - Col–2ndLt 
 7571 VH-3D Presidential Helicopter Pilot Qualified (NMOS) - Col–2ndLt
 7573 Strategic Refueling Area Commander (STRATRAC) (NMOS 7557, 8042) - Col–2ndLt
 7574 Qualified Supporting Arms Coordinator (Airborne) (MOS deleted prior to 1 Oct. 2013)
 7576 Pilot VMO (MOS deleted prior to 1 Oct. 2013)
 7577 Weapons and Tactics Instructor (FMOS) - Col–2ndLt
 7578 Naval Flight Officer, (NFO) Student (TBS) 
 7580 Naval Flight Officer, (NFO) Tactical Navigator Flight Student (NATC)
 7582 Naval Flight Officer, (NFO) FRS Basic EA-6B Electronic Warfare Officer
 7583 Bombardier/Navigator, A-6E Qualified (MOS deleted prior to 1 Oct. 2013)
 7584 Electronic Warfare Officer (EWO), EA-6A Qualified (MOS deleted prior to 1 Oct. 2013)
 7585 Airborne Reconnaissance Officer, (ARO) Qualified RF-4B (MOS deleted prior to 1 Oct. 2013)
 7587 Radar Intercept Officer (RIO), F-4S (MOS deleted prior to 1 Oct. 2013)
 7588 Naval Flight Officer (NFO) Qualified EA-6B Electronic Warfare Officer
 7589 V/STOL Landing Signal Officer (LSO) (MOS merged into FMOS 7594 prior to 1 Oct. 2013)
 7590 Landing Signal Officer Trainee (MOS merged into FMOS 7594 prior to 1 Oct. 2013)
 7591 Naval Flight Officer (VMAW) (MOS redesignated to FMOS 7504 prior to 1 Oct. 2013)
 7592 Pilot VMAW (MOS deleted prior to 1 Oct. 2013)
 7593 Landing Signal Officer, Phase I/II Qualified (MOS merged into FMOS 7594 after to 1 Oct. 2013)
 7594 Landing Signal Officer (FMOS) - LtCol–2ndLt
 7595 Test Pilot/Flight Test Project Officer (FMOS) - Col–2ndLt
 7596 Aviation Safety Officer (FMOS) - Col–2ndLt
 7597 Pilot, Basic Rotary Wing
 7598 Pilot, Basic Fixed Wing
 7599 Flight Student Basic MOS

80 Miscellaneous MOS's (Category II) 

Officer

 8001 Basic Officer Basic MOS
 8002 Joint Terminal Attack Controller (EMOS 0302, 0802, 1802, or 1803)
 8003 General Officer (PMOS) – Gen-BGen
 8005 Special Assignment Officer (FMOS)
 8006 Billet Designator—Unrestricted Officer (FMOS) - Col-Capt
 8007 Billet Designator—Unrestricted Ground Officer (FMOS) - Col-Capt
 8009 Billet Designator—Air Control/Anti-Air Warfare Officer (FMOS)
 8010 Billet Designator-Warrant Officer (FMOS)
 8012 Ground Safety Officer (FMOS)
 8016 Special Technical Operations Officer (FMOS) - Col–2ndLt
 8018 Congressional Marine Liaison - Col-1stLt
 8023 Parachutist Officer (NMOS) - Gen-2ndLt & CWO5-WO
 8024 Combatant Diver Officer (NMOS) - Gen-2ndLt
 8026 Parachutist/Combatant Diver Officer (NMOS) - Gen-2ndLt
 8040 Colonel, Logistician (PMOS) – Col
 8041 Colonel, Ground (PMOS) – Col
 8042 Colonel, Naval Aviator/Naval Flight Officer (PMOS) – Col
 8051 Operations Research Specialist (FMOS)
 8055 Information Management Officer (IMO) (FMOS)
 8056 Hazardous Material/Hazardous Waste (HM/HW) Officer (FMOS) - Capt-2ndLt
 8057 Acquisition Professional Candidate (FMOS)
 8058 Acquisition Manager/Acquisition Core Member (FMOS)
 8059 Aviation Acquisition Management Professional (PMOS) – MajGen-Maj
 8060 Acquisition Specialist (FMOS)
 8061 Acquisition Management Professional (PMOS) – MajGen-Maj
 8077 Weapons And Tactics Instructor (WTI) (FMOS) (FMOS) - LtCol-Capt
 8111 Combat Rubber Reconnaissance Craft Coxswain - SSgt-PFC 
 8220 Billet Designator—Political Military Officer (FMOS*)  - Col–2ndLt
 8221 Regional Affairs Officer, Latin America (FMOS) - Col–2ndLt
 8222 Regional Affairs Officer, Eurasia (FMOS) - Col–2ndLt (Redesignated from FMOS 8222 "Former Soviet Union" prior to 1 Oct 2012.)
 8223 Regional Affairs Officer, People's Republic of China (FMOS) - Col–2ndLt (Redesignated from FMOS 8223 "Northeast Asia" prior to 1 Oct 2012.)
 8224 Regional Affairs Officer, Middle East/North Africa (FMOS) - Col–2ndLt
 8225 Regional Affairs Officer, Sub-Saharan Africa (FMOS) - Col–2ndLt
 8226 Regional Affairs Officer, South Asia (FMOS) - Col–2ndLt
 8227 Regional Affairs Officer, Western Europe (FMOS) - Col–2ndLt
 8228 Regional Affairs Officer, East Asia (Excluding People's Republic of China) (FMOS) - Col–2ndLt
 8229 Regional Affairs Officer, Eastern Europe (Excluding Former Soviet Union) (FMOS) - Col–2ndLt
 8240 Basic Foreign Area Officer (FAO) (FMOS) - Col–2ndLt
 8241 Foreign Area Officer, Latin America (FMOS) - Col–2ndLt
 8242 Foreign Area Officer, Eurasia (FMOS) - Col–2ndLt (Redesignated from FMOS 8242 "Former Soviet Union" prior to 1 Oct 2012.)
 8243 Foreign Area Officer, People's Republic of China (PRC) (FMOS) - Col–2ndLt
 8244 Foreign Area Officer, Middle East/North Africa (FMOS) - Col–2ndLt
 8245 Foreign Area Officer, Sub-Saharan Africa (FMOS) - Col–2ndLt
 8246 Foreign Area Officer, South Asia (FMOS) - Col–2ndLt
 8247 Foreign Area Officer, Western Europe (FMOS) - Col–2ndLt
 8248 Foreign Area Officer, East Asia (Excluding People's Republic of China) (FMOS) - Col–2ndLt
 8249 Foreign Area Officer, Eastern Europe (Excluding Former Soviet Union) (FMOS) - Col–2ndLt
 8640 Requirements Manager (FMOS) - LtCol-Capt & CWO5-CWO2
 8641 Microminature Repairer - MGySgt-LCpl
 8802 Training and Education Officer (FMOS)
 8803 Leadership Development Specialist (FMOS)
 8820 Aeronautical Engineer (FMOS)
 8824 Electronics Engineer (FMOS)
 8825 Modeling and Simulation Officer (FMOS)
 8826 Ordnance Systems Engineer (FMOS)
 8831 Environmental Engineering Management Officer (FMOS)
 8832 Nuclear Engineer (FMOS)
 8834 Technical Information Operations Officer (FMOS)
 8840 Manpower Management Officer (FMOS)
 8844 Financial Management Specialist (FMOS)
 8846 Data Systems Specialist (FMOS)
 8848 Management, Data Systems Officer (FMOS)
 8850 Operations Analyst (FMOS)
 8852 Defense Systems Analyst (FMOS)
 8858 Command, Control, Communications, Computers and Intelligence (C4I) (FMOS)
 8862 Material Management Officer (FMOS)
 8866 Space Plans Officer (FMOS) - LtCol–2ndLt
 8878 Historian (FMOS)
Enlisted

 8000 General Service Marine (BASIC MOS) – MGySgt–Pvt
 8002 Joint Terminal Attack Controller (FMOS) – MGySgt–Sgt
 8011 Basic Marine with Enlistment Guarantee (BASIC MOS) – MGySgt–Pvt
 8012 Ground Safety Officer (Enlisted FMOS) – MSgt–SSgt (renamed from Ground Safety Specialist prior to April 2017)
 8013 Special Assignment—Enlisted (FMOS) – MGySgt–Pvt
 8014 Billet Designator—Enlisted (FMOS*) – MGySgt–Pvt
 8015 College Degree—Enlisted (EMOS) – MGySgt–Pvt
 8016 Special Technical (STO) Administrator (Enlisted FMOS) – MGySgt–Sgt (renamed from Special Technical (STO) Planner as of April 2017)
 8018 Congressional Marine Liaison - MGySgt-Sgt
 8022 Reaper (MQ-9) Sensor Operator - MGySgt-Pvt
 8023 Parachutist (Enlisted) (NMOS) – SgtMaj-Pvt
 8024 Combatant Diver Marine (Enlisted) (NMOS) – SgtMaj/MGySgt–Pvt
 8026 Parachutist/Combatant Diver Marine (NMOS) – SgtMaj/MGySgt–Pvt
 8028 MECEP Participant (FMOS) – MGySgt–Pvt
 8033 Quality Assurance Technician (Subsistence)
 8056 Hazardous Material/Hazardous Waste Staff NCO/NCO (FMOS) – MGySgt–LCpl
 8060 Acquisition Specialist (Enlisted) (FMOS) – MGySgt–SSgt
 8071 Special Operations Capabilities Specialist (SOCS) (NMOS) – MGySgt–Sgt
 8111 Combat Rubber Reconnaissance Craft (CRRC) Coxswain - SSgt-PFC
 8112 Riverine Assault Craft (RAC) Crewman - GySgt-PFC
 8114 Rigid Raiding Craft (RRC)/Rigid Hull Inflatable Boat (RHIB) Coxswain - SSgt-PFC
 8151 Billet Designator—Guard (FMOS*) – GySgt–Pvt
 8152 Billet Designator—Marine Corps Security Force (MCSF) Guard (EMOS) – GySgt–Pvt
 8153 Billet Designator—Marine Corps Security Force (MCSF) Cadre Trainer (EMOS) – GySgt–Cpl
 8154 Billet Designator—Marine Corps Security Force Close Quarters Battle (CQB) Team Member (FMOS*) – SSgt–LCpl
 8156 Marine Security Guard (MSG) (FMOS) – MGySgt–PFC
 8230 Foreign Area Staff Non-Commissioned Officer Basic/In-Training Foreign Area SNCO - SgtMajor-SSgt
 8231 Education Assistant - GySgt-Pvt
 8411 Recruiter (EMOS) – GySgt–Sgt
 8412 Career Recruiter (PMOS) – MGySgt–GySgt
 8421 Production Recruiter - Sgt
 8422 Career Prior Service Recruiter - MGySgt-SSgt
 8431 Psychological Operations Noncommissioned Officer - GySgt-Cpl
 8511 Drill Instructor - SgtMaj/MGySgt-Sgt
 8513 Marine Combat Instructor - GySgt-Cpl
 8530 Marksmanship Coach - Sgt-PFC
 8531 Billet Designator—Marksmanship Instructor - MGySgt-Sgt
 8532 Small Arms Weapons Instructor - MGySgt-Sgt
 8534 Equal Opportunity Advisor (EOA) - MGySgt-SSgt
 8538 Substance Abuse Counselor - MGySgt-Sgt
 8541 Scout Sniper - GySgt-LCpl
 8552 Martial Arts Instructor - MGySgt-Cpl
 8552 Martial Arts Instructor-Trainer - MGySgt-Sgt
 8563 Water Safety/Survival Instructor - MGySgt-Pvt
 8611 Interpreter (Designated Language) - MGySgt-Pvt
 8621 Surveillance Sensor Operator (NMOS) – MSgt–Pvt
 8623 Small Unmanned Aircraft System Specialist (FMOS) – MGySgt-LCpl 
 8640 Requirements Manager (FMOS) – MGySgt-SSgt (new FMOS as of May 2018)
 8641 Microminiature Repairer (NMOS 21XX, 28XX, 59XX) – GySgt–LCpl
 8652 Reconnaissance Man, Parachute Qualified - SgtMaj/MGySgt-Pvt
 8653 Reconnaissance Man, Combatant Diver Qualified - SgtMaj/MGySgt-Pvt
 8654 Reconnaissance Man, Parachute and Combatant Diver Qualified - SgtMaj/MGySgt-Pvt
 8711 Ground Command and Control (C2) Operations NCO (EMOS) – Sgt–LCpl (formerly Ground Operations Specialist)
 8713 Ground Operations Specialist (EMOS) – GySgt to SSgt (new EMOS as of April 2017)
 8811 Firefighter (FMOS) – GySgt–Pvt (FMOS deleted after 2005 and prior to April 2017)
 8910 GCE Marine (FMOS) – MGySgt–Pvt
 8911 Billet Designator—Barracks and Grounds Marine (FMOS*) – GySgt–Pvt
 8915 Billet Designator—Food Service Attendant - LCpl-Pvt
 8921 Billet Designator—Athletic and Recreation Assistant - MGySgt-Pvt
 8972 Aircrew Trainee (PMOS) – GySgt-Pvt
 8991 Sergeant Major of the Marine Corps (PMOS) – SgtMaj
 8999 Sergeant Major/First Sergeant (PMOS) – SgtMaj and 1stSgt

90 Identifying and Reporting MOSs (Category III) 

Enlisted

 9051 Graves Registration Specialist - MGySgt-Cpl
 9811 Member, The President's Own, United States Marine Band - MGySgt-SSgt
 9812 Member, "The Commandant's Own," U.S. Marine Drum & Bugle Corps - MGySgt-Pvt
 9900 General Service Marine - MGySgt-Pvt
 9915 Special Assignment—Enlisted - MGySgt-Pvt
 9916 Billet Designator—Enlisted - MGySgt-Pvt
 9917 College Degree—Enlisted - MGySgt-Pvt
 9928 MECEP Participant - MGySgt-Pvt
 9935 Special Technical Operations - MGySgt-Pvt
 9936 Substance Abuse Control Specialist - MGySgt-SSgt
 9952 Combatant Diver Marine - SgtMaj/MGySgt-Pvt
 9953 Parachutist/Combatant Diver Marine - SgtMaj/MGySgt-Pvt
 9954 Hazardous Material/Hazardous Waste (HM/HW) Staff Noncommissioned Officer/Noncommissioned Officer - MGySgt-LCpl
 9956 Ground Safety Specialist - GySGt-Pvt
 9960 Acquisition Specialist - MGySgt-SSgt
 9962 Parachutist - SgtMaj/MGySgt-Pvt
 9971 Basic Marine with Enlistment Guarantee - MGySgt-Pvt
 9972 Aircrew Trainee - GySgt-Pvt
 9973 Fixed-Wing Transport Aircraft Specialist, KC-130J - MGySgt-Pvt
 9974 Vertical Takeoff Unmanned Aerial Vehicle Specialist - MGySgt-Pvt
 9976 Helicopter Specialist, AH-1Z/UH-1Y - MGySgt-Pvt
 9986 Joint Terminal Attack Controller - MGySgt-SSgt
 9991 Sergeant Major of the Marine Corps - SgtMaj
 9999 Sergeant Major-First Sergeant - SgtMaj-1stSgt

Officer

 9666 Space Operations Officer
 9701 Joint Specialty Officer Nominee (FMOS) – Col-Capt
 9702 Joint Specialty Officer (JSO) (FMOS) – Col-Maj
 9860 Human Resources Management Officer (FMOS) (redesignated FMOS 8840, Manpower Management Officer)
 9934 Information Operations Staff Officer
 9957 Acquisition Professional Candidate
 9958 Acquisition Management/Acquisition Core Member
 9959 Acquisition Management Professional
 9986 Joint Terminal Attack Controller

See also 
 Air Force Specialty Code
 Badges of the United States Marine Corps
 Headquarters Marine Corps
 List of United States Army careers
 List of United States Coast Guard ratings
 List of United States Navy ratings
 List of United States Navy staff corps
 Organization of the United States Marine Corps

Explanatory notes

References

External links 
 NAVMC 1008-A-2016: USMC MOS CHART at marines.mil
 1960s Era USMC MOS Code
 1970s Era USMC MOS Code
 List of USMC MOS Descriptions at About.com

Military Occupational Specialty
Marine Corps